A New Game Plus, also New Game+ (NG+), is an unlockable video game mode available in some video games that allows the player to start a new game after they finish it at least once, where certain features in NG+ not normally available in a first playthrough are added, or where certain aspects of the finished game affect the newly started game, such as keeping in the new game items or experience gained in the first playthrough. New Game Plus is also known as "replay mode", "remorting", "challenge mode", or "New Game Ex". The genre where they are most prevalent is role-playing video games.

Origin
The term was coined in the 1995 role-playing video game Chrono Trigger, but examples can be found in earlier games, such as Digital Devil Story: Megami Tensei, The Legend of Zelda, Ghosts 'n Goblins, and Super Mario Bros.. This play mode is most often found in role-playing video games, where starting a New Game Plus will usually have the player characters start the new game with the statistics and/or equipment with which they ended the last game. Key items that are related to the story are normally removed so they cannot ruin the game's progression, and are given back to the player at the time they are needed; likewise, characters that the player acquires throughout the story will also not appear until their scheduled place and time, but will get the enhanced stats from the previous playthrough.

Examples

Games with multiple endings, such as Chrono Trigger, may feature a New Game Plus mode which allows the player to explore alternate endings. Many games increase the difficulty in a New Game Plus mode, such as those in the Mega Man Battle Network series and Borderlands series. Others use the feature to advance the plot. In Astro Boy: Omega Factor, the player uses the game's Stage Select mechanism, explained in-story as a form of time travel, to avert disaster, while in Eternal Darkness: Sanity's Requiem, the player defeats three different final bosses, one in each playthrough, to access the true ending.

Some New Game Plus variations alter established gameplay. This includes unlocking new characters, such as in Castlevania: Symphony of the Night; new areas, such as in Parasite Eve; new items, such as in the Metal Gear series; new challenges, such as in the .hack series, or new weapon and armor upgrades, like in God of War II's Bonus Mode and God of War (2018)'s New Game+ mode.

Games that connect to online marketplaces may require the player to complete a New Game Plus game to obtain certain achievements, such as the "Calamity Kid" achievement in the game Bastion. Others may require or be required by additional purchases in the form of downloadable content, such as in Yakuza: Like a Dragon.

A slight variation of the New Game Plus is the clear game, also known as a "post-game scenario". The player may continue after the main story is completed, allowing them to see the effects of their choices upon the game world and narrative, and to complete any remaining side quests. EarthBound is an early case of the clear game, later used in major franchises such as The Legend of Zelda, Fallout, Grand Theft Auto, Pokémon, and Star Ocean.

Final Fantasy XIV is a MMORPG with an extensive story line called the "main scenario quest" or colloquially the "MSQ". A New Game Plus option was introduced in the Shadowbringers expansion pack which allows players to replay the main scenario quest in its entirety or specific expansion's stories.

See also 
 Incremental games

References

Video game gameplay
Video game terminology